Marjan Kalhor (born 21 July 1988 in Tehran) is an Iranian alpine skier who became the first Iranian woman to participate in the Winter Olympics, at the 2010 Vancouver Olympics. Kalhor competed in the slalom and giant slalom competitions. She was her nation's flag bearer in the Opening Ceremony. Kalhor finished 60th among 86 competitors in the Giant Slalom  and 55th among 87 participants in the Slalom.

Kalhor started skiing at the age of four, in the Dizin resort north of Tehran, in the Alborz mountain range. At the age of eleven, she won a national competition, and later competed and won medals in Turkey and Lebanon. She has not yet competed in a World Cup event. Kalhor is studying to become a physical education teacher.

References

External links
 
 

Living people
1988 births
Olympic alpine skiers of Iran
Iranian female alpine skiers
Alpine skiers at the 2010 Winter Olympics
People from Tehran
Alpine skiers at the 2007 Asian Winter Games
Alpine skiers at the 2011 Asian Winter Games
Iranian people of Kurdish descent